Bruty is a municipality and village in the Nové Zámky District in the Nitra Region of south-west Slovakia.

Etymology
Slovak/Slavic brť from Proto-Slavic bъrtь - a hive of forest bees.  Buruth 1223, Borth 1342, Barth 1773.

History
In historical records the village was first mentioned in 1223.

Geography
The village lies at an altitude of 156 metres and covers an area of 23.532 km². It has a population of about 776 people.

Ethnicity
The population is about 91% Hungarian, 7% Slovak and 2% Gypsy.

Facilities
The village has a public library and football pitch.

Genealogical resources

The records for genealogical research are available at the state archive "Statny Archiv in Nitra, Slovakia"

 Roman Catholic church records (births/marriages/deaths): 1784-1832 (parish A)

See also
 List of municipalities and towns in Slovakia

References

External links

https://web.archive.org/web/20071217080336/http://www.statistics.sk/mosmis/eng/run.html
Surnames of living people in Bruty
Bruty – Nové Zámky okolie

Villages and municipalities in Nové Zámky District